Brand New Love Affair may refer to:

 Brand New Love Affair (EP), an EP by Amanda Lear
 "Brand New Love Affair" (song), a song by Chicago